The Gran Premio Tecate was a round of the Champ Car World Series held on the Autodromo Hermanos Rodriguez circuit in Mexico City, Mexico. It was first held in 1980, and in its first two years of competition was the penultimate round of the championship. After its re-inception in 2002, it was the season-ending round. It was to have been the penultimate round of the 2007 season, but became the final round when the Grand Prix Arizona was cancelled.

2007 race

During the 2007 race, three drivers failed to get going off the grid. Also, Robert Doornbos — placed 3rd in the Champ Car point standings entering the race — had car problems early and was out of the race by lap 10, although he returned later to trying and accomplish the fastest lap of the race and secure an extra bonus point toward the championship.

The top three results of the race were Sébastien Bourdais, Will Power and Oriol Servià. It concluded the final Champ Car season, as the series was absorbed by the IndyCar Series in February 2008.

Past winners

References

External links
 Champ Car Stats Mexico City archive

 
Sports competitions in Mexico City